PetSynth is an open-source music software for the Commodore PET computer, created in 2007 by Chiron Bramberger. It is noteworthy for being the only keyboard playable synthesizer for the Commodore PET that supports MIDI, stereo sound, and is released under a GPL license. It has been featured in print and web publications such as Return Magazin, TPUG Magazine, Commodore Free Magazine, Retrothing, and MatrixSynth.

History 
Having been unable to find any software that allows the Commodore PET to be played like an instrument, and after having found similar software for other computers systems in his collection, such as the Apple II, Apple IIGS, VIC-20, and Commodore 64, creator Chiron Bramberger decided to create his own software. The first version of PetSynth was released in 2007. Since then, there have been several revisions, with the third version demonstrated at the TPUG World of Commodore in 2013.

Features 
The original version of the software allowed a user to play on the keyboard layout as if it were a musical piano keyboard. It included several effects that allowed the player to change the sounds in interesting ways as they played. The third version, as of 2013, included support for a MIDI adapter, and a second voice feature never before realized. This allowed for stereo sound on a Commodore PET for the first time.

See also
 List of music software

References

External links
 http://www.petsynth.org/

Music software